Charles Bradley Miller (September 10, 1868 – September 3, 1945) was a Major League Baseball outfielder.

In 656 games over seven seasons, Miller posted a .301 batting average (771-for-2561) with 445 runs, 22 
home runs, 421 RBI, 206 stolen bases, 174 bases on balls and .421 slugging percentage.

Miller died in Memphis, Tennessee in 1945 of coronary thrombosis.

See also
 List of Major League Baseball career stolen bases leaders

References

External links

1868 births
1945 deaths
Major League Baseball outfielders
Baseball players from Pennsylvania
St. Louis Perfectos players
St. Louis Browns (AA) players
Cincinnati Reds players
Baltimore Orioles (AA) players
19th-century baseball players
Niagara Purple Eagles baseball players
Toledo Mud Hens players
Chattanooga Lookouts players
Memphis Egyptians players
Birmingham Barons players
Mobile Sea Gulls players
Nashville Vols players
People from Oil City, Pennsylvania
Nashville Tigers players
Deaths from coronary thrombosis